Stewart Castle (also known as Newtownstewart Castle) is situated in Newtownstewart, County Tyrone, Northern Ireland. It was built in 1619 by Sir Robert Newcomen in an English manor house style. It was damaged during the Irish Rebellion of 1641 by Sir Phelim O' Neill and in 1689 on King James' return from the Siege of Derry. King James ordered the Stewart Castle, and the town, to be burnt down. In the main street a piece of the castle wall still stands.

Newtownstewart Plantation castle is a State Care Historic Monument in the townland of Newtownstewart, in Strabane District Council area, at grid ref: H4020 8583.

An intact Bronze Age cist grave was found within castle site. It was excavated in 1999.

See also 
Castles in Northern Ireland

References 

Bronze Age burial cist - Newtownstewart
Stewart Castle
County Tyrone.com

External links 
Newtownstewart Castle

Castles in County Tyrone
Ruined castles in Northern Ireland